Shake, Rattle & Roll XV is a 2014 Filipino horror anthology film directed by Dondon Santos, Jerrold Tarog, and Perci Intalan, and the fifteenth and final installment of the Shake, Rattle & Roll film series. The film stars an ensemble cast including Erich Gonzales, JC de Vera, Carla Abellana, Dennis Trillo, Lovi Poe, and Matteo Guidicelli.

The film was produced by Regal Entertainment, Inc. The film is an official entry in the 40th Metro Manila Film Festival and was released on December 25, 2014, in Philippine cinemas nationwide. It is the most expensive installment in the Shake, Rattle & Roll film series, although the film's co-producer Lily Monteverde stated "she doesn't want to reveal its exact budget yet".

Plot

"Ahas"
The episode is a retelling of the urban legend about the snake man said to live underneath Robinsons Galleria.

Troy's wife Julie (Solenn Heusaff) was locked at Alegria Mall's department store dressing room and is killed after a snake man killed her. Troy (JC de Vera) suddenly wakes up after a bad dream about the death of his wife.

Fashion designer Iggy Moda (John Lapus) is planning to organize an event culminating Alegria Mall's Silver Anniversary. To make the mall's anniversary very special, Iggy conceptualizes fashion collection and mall's new logo, but at the same time, thinks of reviving the rumors about Alegria Mall's alleged half-human half-snake lurking somewhere deep in the mall which has been the reason of the disappearances of some shoppers. Sarah (Erich Gonzales), the half-human half snake, looks out in the vent and sees Troy, in whom she fall in love and becomes obsessed. Along with the mall's 25th anniversary is Sandra Alegria's (Erich Gonzales) 25th birthday. Coming back from the United States, she welcomes the new members as part of the mall company's board of officers and as the head of the company. Sandra also denies the rumors circulating between her and her alleged twin snake sister.

A shoplifter (Melai Cantiveros) plans to steal some clothes and items from the mall's department store by wearing multiple shirts. A saleswoman picks up on her behavior and takes her to a dressing room, which she secretly locks her in. After she finishes putting them on in the dressing room, she hears trembling sounds and feels movement, and discovers a chamber. She is then killed by Sarah. After she kills the shoplifter, she tells her evil self that she met someone named Troy, but her evil self insists that she will never be loved by someone because of her appearance as a snake. Troy strolls around the mall while still grieving and finding answers to his wife's disappearance, until he finds himself in front of the department store where he last saw his wife. He tries to open the dressing room door where his wife last went to, but is stopped by the same saleslady who had locked the shoplifter inside.

Meanwhile, security guards and staff members check the premises as the mall closes. Janitor Mang Banjo (Lou Veloso) takes his cleaning rounds to Sarah's chamber and nervously cleans the mess carefully and silently. Sarah calls him as he tries to retreat to the elevator. Mang Banjo carefully communicates with Sarah to avoid angering her, but Sarah becomes furious when she notices that he continues to avoid eye contact. Sarah turns the janitor around in front of her to make him face her, and he rushes to the lift. However, Sarah escapes with him, and the old man realizes that it was a trick. Mang Banjo immediately calls the twins' father, Alberto (Ariel Rivera), for help, who then prepares a handgun to meet Sarah. Meanwhile, Jake (Jason Francisco) sees Sarah in the dark in the department store wearing a dress, and recognizes her at first as Sandra. He runs away as he sees Sarah transform into a snake with arms, and is killed when Sarah catches up to him.

Alberto talks to Sandra about Sarah's escape from her chamber. Then he later tells her that he just wanted to have good luck; an old witch doctor had handed him a vial containing medicine which could bring good luck to his mall business. He tricks their mother, Lourdes (Alice Dixson), into drinking the medicine concealed in wine, which results in her giving birth to Sarah and Sandra. Lourdes believes Sarah to be a curse and wishes her killed, but Alberto keeps Sarah under the mall's basement, due to his belief that she can bring good luck to the family and the business. Sarah was fed at first with animals, until she tasted human blood when a construction worker falls from an accident down into the chamber. Sandra remembers visiting Sarah ever since their childhood until they said their goodbyes to each other. Alberto then plans to kill Sarah once and for all. Meanwhile, Troy returns to his house and gets a knife, plotting revenge to kill Sarah before returning to the mall.

Back at the mall, Iggy officially unveils his masterpiece, a statue resembling the alleged half-human half-snake as part of the anniversary. Alberto arrives and orders Iggy to remove the image, for it ruins the mall's reputation. Alberto, Sandra, and Mang Banjo hurriedly return to the chamber, hoping to stop Sarah from her evil plans. Sarah shows up and is glad, believing that Alberto returned to introduce her to everyone, especially Troy. Meanwhile, Troy independently enters the secret dressing room and finds the secret chamber. Meanwhile, Alberto argues with Sarah and that he despises her, and then Sandra steps into Sarah's view and the two briefly reunite. Alberto and Sandra continue to argue with her, telling her that she had caused chaos and that she needs to stop. Sarah becomes enraged when she realizes that she is not planned to be a part of their mall's anniversary celebration, and claims that Alberto became greedy. Alberto draws his gun and tries in vain to shoot Sarah as she transforms fully into a snake, and is captured when Sarah binds him by her tail. He is then thrown by Sarah and dies after hitting his head on a bathtub rim.

Taking advantage of the commotion, Troy stabs Sarah in the back of her lower snake body, enraging her. Sandra, Troy, and Mang Banjo hurriedly escape the chamber; the trio then warns Iggy and the board members to leave the mall before they seek shelter in a hardware store to find more weapons. At the store, Sandra learns from Troy that Sarah killed his wife. They return to the mall and Sandra goes alone to find Sarah, and tries to bargain with her to figure out a new life together. Troy attempts to sneak-attack Sarah with his knife, but she knocks him down and then swallows him whole. While in her snake stomach, Troy kills Sarah from inside and then cuts his way out using his knife, leaving Sandra heartbroken and guilty.

"Ulam"
Cold couple, Aimee and Henry moves to their Ama Choleng's mansion after she dies. They meet the caretaker of the house, Aling Lina. Aimee and Henry are fed by Lina, food. While eating, Aimee accidentally chews a lizard's tail while eating the food. Disgusted by this, they all dismissed one another and proceeds to their bedroom. Each time they eat every meal Lina serves, they are being transformed from normal human beings, to animals (based on their Zodiac sign) and sets a full wage war in their household.

"Flight 666"
Dave (Matteo Guidicelli) boards Manila Air Flight 666, traveling from Manila to Zamboanga. On board are two vloggers and members of a famous band Eli (Yael Yuzon) and Gino (Khalil Ramos) flying home to do a gig in the province and their fans, friends Adam (IC Mendoza) and Lovely (Kiray Celis) who coincidentally boarded the flight with Gino, her idolized celebrity, celebrity vlogger and television show host Tim (Kim Atienza), socialite father and son Macoy (Bentong) and Macky (Betong Sumaya), fired baggage handling supervisor Carlos, and Jane (Ria Garcia), who is pregnant, along with her grandmother Lola Juling (Lui Manansala). Also on the flight are socialite Connie (Joy Viado) and married couple Brandon (John Spainhour) and Miranda (Arlene Muhlach), all of whom are seated at the first class cabin. Passengers are welcomed by flight attendant Bryan (Daniel Matsunaga) and are accommodated by co-flight attendants Pamela (Nathalie Hart) and Karen (Lovi Poe). Karen suddenly bumps into Dave, who was her ex-boyfriend, apologizes to Dave of what happened to both of them in the past, but Dave ignores her apology.

While the plane takes off, Lola Juling insists Jane to pretend that she fell in love with a foreigner volunteer as soon as they get their way home, which later turned out that she fell in love with a creature and is the father of their baby "tiyanak". After the plane reached its cruising altitude, Carlos instigates a hijacking, interrogating the crew in the flight deck on the reason of the airline company laying off some employees as part of the company's cost-cutting strategy and demands the airline to wire money to an account to form compensation for the airline's laid off employees. Connie overhears the chaos and hides in one of the lavatories only to find the couple doing a mile high club, whom she urges to calm down and stop their acts out of fear of being killed. Meanwhile, Jane gives birth to her baby creature and suddenly passes out along with the baby. The plane suddenly went into a short turbulence and faints almost everyone on board, except for Lola Juling, who dies in the process. Unknown to them, the creature lurks out and scratches some of the passengers. Karen later overhears a conversation between Carlos and Pamela, which she realizes Pamela helps in making Carlos' plans succeed.

In the lavatory, Miranda fights with Connie until the tiyanak comes out of nowhere and kills Brandon, Connie and Miranda in the process and soon attacks the rest of the passengers on board one by one, including Pamela, Eli, Macoy and Macky and another passenger (Sue Prado). The remaining passengers seek safety, except for Adam. Capt. Robert Francisco (Rolando Inocencio) tasked Bryan and Officer Charlie (Ken Alfonso) to check on the situation on board. Meanwhile, Adam is killed and hanged by the creature's umbilical cord while Carlos fights himself with the creature with a gun and is killed by the baby creature. The creature attacks the flight deck and strangles the pilot. Karen, Bryan, Dave and the remaining passengers make a plan to safety as Tim and Bryan fly the plane after losing the pilots. Gino and Lovely discovers a bomb underneath the seats which is ready to detonate. On the contrary, Karen finds the child on the floor and picks it up, while Dave throws it away from her before it transforms again into a tiyanak. Karen, Dave, Gino and Lovely runs out to safety, but the creature traps Karen and Dave. Coincidentally, Iggy wakes up and is attacked by the creature.

After the flight lands safely, the creature attacks again and kills Lovely. Karen, Dave, Gino, Tim and Bryan escapes the plane as the bomb planted by the hijacker explodes, killing the creature. As the survivors tell the tale to the authorities, Karen and Dave walk away together as the father of the creature vengefully appears behind them in the distance. After the credits, Iggy is shown to have survived the explosion.

Cast

Ahas

 Erich Gonzales as Sandra/Sarah
 JC De Vera as Troy
 Ariel Rivera as Alberto
 John Lapus as Iggy
 Lou Veloso as Badjo
 Alice Dixson as Lourdes
 Giselle Canlas as Jinny
 Melai Cantiveros as Julie
 Jason Francisco as Jake
 Mosang as Saleslady 1
 Anne Monique Villanueva as Saleslady 2
 Solenn Heussaff as Adela

Ulam

 Dennis Trillo as Henry
 Carla Abellana as Aimee
 Chanda Romero as Aling Lina
 John Lapus as Iggy
 Perla Bautista as Amah Choleng
 Kryshee Frencheska Grengria as Julie
 Yogo Singh as Paolo
 Richard Quan as Young Angkong
 Cris Villonco as Young Amah
 Anna Luna as Young Aling Lina

Flight 666

 Lovi Poe as Karen
 Matteo Guidicelli as Dave
 John Lapus as Iggy Moda
 Daniel Matsunaga as Bryan
 Bernard Palanca as Carlos
 Kiray Celis as Lovely
 IC Mendoza as Adam
 Kim Atienza as Tim
 Nathalie Hart as Pamela
 Lui Manansala as Lola Juling
 Ria Garcia as Jane
 Khalil Ramos as Gino
 Yael Yuzon as Eli
 Bentong† as Macoy
 Betong Sumaya as Macky
 Rolando Inocencio as Capt. Robert Francisco
 Joy Viado† as Connie
 John Spainhour as Brandon
 Arlene Muhlach as Miranda
 Sue Pardo as Norma
 Ken Alfonso as First Officer Charlie
 Rocky Salumbides as The Impakto

Production
Maja Salvador was originally chosen for the lead role in the "Ahas" segment, until she was replaced by Erich Gonzales. The snake-skin costume for the character of Gonzales measures 20 feet long and takes about five hours to fully apply the costume's prosthetics onto her. Almost the whole segment of "Flight 666" was shot on board a retired Philippine Airlines Airbus A330 parked at Villamor Airbase. Lovi Poe, the leading actress of the segment, stated that they filmed it while the plane was flying. Filming of "Ulam" wrapped on November 1, 2014.

Release

Box office
Shake, Rattle & Roll XV opened at 6th place in the box office out of the eight films in the 40th Metro Manila Film Festival.

Accolades

Awards and nominations

See also
Shake, Rattle & Roll (film series)
List of ghost films

References

External links
 

2014 films
2014 horror films
Films about snakes
Films about twin sisters
Films directed by Jerrold Tarog
Films set on airplanes
Philippine anthology films
Philippine aviation films
Philippine horror anthology films
Philippine supernatural horror films
Regal Entertainment films
15
Films directed by Dondon Santos
Films directed by Perci Intalan